This partial list of graphs contains definitions of graphs and graph families which are known by particular names, but do not have a Wikipedia article of their own.

For collected definitions of graph theory terms that do not refer to individual graph types, such as vertex and path, see Glossary of graph theory. For links to existing articles about particular kinds of graphs, see Category:Graphs.

Gear

A gear graph, denoted Gn is a graph obtained by inserting an extra vertex between each pair of adjacent vertices on the perimeter of a wheel graph Wn. Thus, Gn has 2n+1 vertices and 3n edges. Gear graphs are examples of squaregraphs, and play a key role in the forbidden graph characterization of squaregraphs. Gear graphs are also known as cogwheels and bipartite wheels.

Helm
A helm graph, denoted Hn is a graph obtained by attaching a single edge and node to each node of the outer circuit of a wheel graph Wn.

Lobster
A lobster graph is a tree in which all the vertices are within distance 2 of a central path.  Compare caterpillar.

Web

The web graph Wn,r is a graph consisting of r concentric copies of the cycle graph Cn, with corresponding vertices connected by "spokes". Thus Wn,1 is the same graph as Cn, and Wn,2 is a prism.

A web graph has also been defined as a prism graph Yn+1, 3, with the edges of the outer cycle removed.

See also

 Gallery of named graphs

References

Mathematics-related lists